Ric Roman Waugh (born February 20, 1968) is an American film director, writer, producer, actor, and former stuntman. He is known for his work in Felon (2008), Snitch (2013), and Shot Caller (2017). He wrote and directed Angel Has Fallen (2019), the third installment in the Has Fallen series and will write and direct Night Has Fallen, the fourth installment in the Has Fallen series.

He is the older brother of director Scott Waugh.

Career
Waugh worked as a stunt performer in the 1980s and 1990s, appearing in films such as Universal Soldier, The Last of the Mohicans, Last Action Hero, Hard Target, The Crow, Gone in 60 Seconds, Lethal Weapon 2, Days of Thunder, and The One. He also worked as an actor, in Kuffs (1992) starring Christian Slater and Milla Jovovich.

His first directorial film is In the Shadows (2001), starring James Caan, Matthew Modine, and Cuba Gooding Jr. He later directed Felon (2008), starring Val Kilmer. Waugh worked with actor Dwayne Johnson in Snitch (2013) and was in talks to direct the disaster film Deepwater Horizon in 2012, before changes occurred in the film's development process. In 2019, Waugh wrote and directed the third installment in the Has Fallen film series, titled Angel Has Fallen.

He directed the film Greenland that came out in December 2020.

Filmography

Stunts

Acting credits

Collaborators

References

External links
 

1968 births
Living people
21st-century American male writers
21st-century American screenwriters
Action film directors
American male screenwriters
American stunt performers
Film directors from Los Angeles
Screenwriters from California
Writers from Los Angeles